Farce of the Penguins is a 2007 American direct-to-video parody nature documentary written and directed by Full House star Bob Saget. It is a parody of the French feature-length nature documentary March of the Penguins directed and co-written by Luc Jacquet. The film features Samuel L. Jackson as narrator, with the two main characters voiced by Saget and Lewis Black. Five of Saget's former Full House co-stars also lent their voices to the film.

Additional voices were also provided by Tracy Morgan, Christina Applegate, James Belushi, Whoopi Goldberg, Dane Cook, Abe Vigoda, Mo'Nique, David Koechner, Jamie Kennedy, Harvey Fierstein, Alyson Hannigan, and others.

Synopsis
Samuel L. Jackson narrates the story about a group of male penguins that make a seventy-mile trek to go to their breeding grounds, where females are waiting to have sex with them.

These penguins include Carl (Bob Saget) and Jimmy (Lewis Black), two friends who talk about relationships and other things as they meet new characters including Marcus (Tracy Morgan), a penguin who likes to kid around and brag about his huge penis (an illogical point, since penguins do not have penises, and instead have cloacas), and Steve the snowy owl (Jonathan Katz), who gives Carl advice on his life in a Freudian kind of way while billing him for the two quick sessions. Meanwhile, Melissa (Christina Applegate) and Vicky (Mo'Nique) argue about men and other women who bother them as they wait for their mates to arrive at the breeding grounds.

Cast

Production
THINKFilm describes Farce of the Penguins as the story of "one penguin's search for love while on a seventy mile trek with his libidinous buddies on their way to a hedonistic mating ritual." Despite what the poster suggests, Farce of the Penguins is not an animated feature; it uses real stock footage of penguins.

Bob Saget stated on The Howard Stern Show on January 29, 2007, Late Night with Conan O'Brien on January 30, 2007, and on Tom Green Live that he originally wanted to simply redub the documentary March of the Penguins, but did not receive permission from the film producers.

References

External links

 
 
 
 

2007 direct-to-video films
2007 films
2000s parody films
2000s adventure films
American satirical films
2000s road movies
American road movies
Films about penguins
Films directed by Bob Saget
American parody films
2007 comedy films
2000s English-language films
2000s American films